Brendan Kelly (born 20 May 1946) is a Irish former Roman Catholic prelate who served as Bishop of Galway and Kilmacduagh and Apostolic Administrator of Kilfenora between 2018 and 2022.

Early life and education
Kelly was born in Derrybrien, County Galway on 20 May 1946, the second of nine children to Seán Kelly, a primary school teacher, and his wife Annie. He attended primary school at Craughwell National School and secondary school at St. Mary's College, before studying for the priesthood at St Patrick's College, Maynooth, completing a Bachelor of Arts in philosophy in 1967 and a Bachelor of Divinity in 1970.

Kelly was ordained a priest for the Diocese of Galway and Kilmacduagh on 20 June 1971.

Presbyteral ministry 
Following ordination, Kelly's first pastoral appointment was as curate in Kinvara, before being appointed as teacher at Coláiste Éinde, Salthill in 1972. It was during this appointment that he completed a higher diploma in education from University College Galway in 1973. Kelly was subsequently appointed teacher at Our Lady's College, Gort in 1980, and later president of the college in 1986 until its amalgamation into Gort Community School in 1995.

He undertook a sabbatical year to serve as chaplain to the L'Arche community in Cuise-la-Motte, France, before returning to Ireland in 1996, when he was appointed parish priest in Lisdoonvarna/Kilshanny.

Kelly was named a canon of the cathedral chapter and vicar forane of the Kilfenora deanery on 19 June 2002. The following year, he was appointed parish priest in Spiddal. Kelly was appointed vicar general of the diocese by Martin Drennan in 2005, and a Chaplain of His Holiness by Pope Benedict XVI on 6 March 2006.

Episcopal ministry

Bishop of Achonry 
Kelly was appointed Bishop-elect of Achonry by Pope Benedict XVI on 20 November 2007. He admitted his surprise but pleasure at his appointment, and promised to concentrate his initial efforts on becoming acquainted with the clergy and laity of the diocese, while the Archbishop of Armagh and Primate of All Ireland, Seán Brady, described him as "a man of prayer, filled with love for the Word of God and the pastoral care of people". 

Kelly was consecrated by Brady on 27 January 2008 in the Cathedral of the Annunciation of the Blessed Virgin Mary and St Nathy, Ballaghaderreen.

Bishop of Galway and Kilmacduagh 
Kelly was subsequently appointed Bishop-elect of Galway and Kilmacduagh and Apostolic Administrator-elect of Kilfenora by Pope Francis on 11 December 2017. He was installed on 11 February 2018 in the Cathedral of Our Lady Assumed into Heaven and St Nicholas, Galway.

In accordance with canon law, Kelly submitted his episcopal resignation to the Dicastery for Bishops on his 75th birthday on 20 May 2021. Following the announcement by Pope Francis on 16 November 2021 that the Dioceses of Clonfert and Galway, Kilmacduagh and Kilfenora would be united in persona episcopi, the first-ever union of its kind in Ireland, he remained in the see until the appointment of his successor, Michael Duignan, on 11 February 2022.

Notes and references

Notes

References

External links
Bishop Brendan Kelly on Catholic-Hierarchy.org
Bishop Brendan Kelly on GCatholic

1946 births
Living people
Alumni of the University of Galway
Alumni of St Patrick's College, Maynooth
21st-century Roman Catholic bishops in Ireland
Irish schoolteachers
Roman Catholic bishops of Achonry
21st-century Irish bishops